The 2021 Women's Masters Basel was held from October 1 to 3 at the Curlingzentrum Region Basel in Arlesheim, Switzerland as part of the World Curling Tour. The event was held in a round-robin format with a purse of 35,000 CHF. It was the second women's World Curling Tour event of the 2021–22 curling season.

Teams
The teams are listed as follows:

Round-robin standings 
Final round-robin standings

Round-robin results
All draw times listed in Central European Time (UTC+01:00).

Draw 1
Friday, October 1, 9:00 am

Draw 2
Friday, October 1, 12:00 pm

Draw 3
Friday, October 1, 3:30 pm

Draw 4
Friday, October 1, 7:00 pm

Draw 5
Saturday, October 2, 9:00 am

Draw 6
Saturday, October 2, 12:00 pm

Draw 7
Saturday, October 2, 3:30 pm

Draw 8
Saturday, October 2, 7:00 pm

Playoffs

Source:

Quarterfinals
Sunday, October 3, 8:00 am

Semifinals
Sunday, October 3, 11:15 am

Final
Sunday, October 3, 2:30 pm

Notes

References

External links
Official Website
CurlingZone
Results from Women's Masters Basel

2021 in women's curling
Women's curling competitions in Switzerland
Sports competitions in Basel
2021 in Swiss sport
September 2021 sports events in Switzerland
21st century in Basel
Arlesheim
2021 in Swiss women's sport